Paul Brooker (born 25 November 1976) is an English retired professional footballer who played as a winger in the Football League for Fulham, Brighton & Hove Albion, Leicester City, Reading and Brentford.

Career

Fulham and Brighton & Hove Albion (1995–2003) 
Able to play on either wing, Brooker began his career as a schoolboy at Chelsea, before joining the youth system at West London rivals Fulham. He turned professional in 1995 and broke through into the first team during the 1996–97 season. He was a part of the team which secured promotion to the Second Division in May 1997. Brooker was out of favour over the course of the following three seasons and made just one league appearance during the Cottagers' 1998–99 promotion season. He spent time away on loan at Stevenage Borough and Brighton & Hove Albion and joined the latter club on a three-year contract for a £25,000 fee in May 2000, a move which reunited him with his former Fulham manager Micky Adams.

After breaking into the starting lineup in February 2001, Brooker became an integral part of the Brighton & Hove Albion team which won consecutive promotions from the Third to the First Division in 2001 and 2002. He turned down a new two-year contract in August 2002 and departed the Withdean Stadium when his contract expired at the end of the 2002–03 season. He made 147 appearances and scored 16 goals during just over three seasons with Brighton & Hove Albion.

Leicester City, Reading and Brentford (2003–2007) 
On 1 July 2003, Brooker reunited with Micky Adams for the third time at Premier League club Leicester City and signed a two-year contract on a free transfer. He made just six appearances during the 2003–04 season and spent just over two months on loan at First Division club Reading, with whom he signed a two-year contract on a free transfer on 2 July 2004. Brooker made 34 appearances during the 2004–05 season, but was allowed to join League One club Brentford on a free transfer on 1 July 2005.

Though Brentford were defeated in the 2006 League One play-off semi-finals, Brooker had a successful 2005–06 season, making 45 appearances and scoring four goals, one of which late in the season versus Swindon Town was described as "a superb individual effort", in which he "ran from within his own half and beat three defenders before scoring". The strike was nominated for the Goal of the Year award at the 2007 Football League Awards. He was again a regular during a disastrous 2006–07 season, which finished with relegation to League Two. The end to Brooker's season was doubly soured when he "stupidly gesticulated in the direction of the fans" after being substituted on the final day during a match versus Tranmere Rovers. Supporter taunts led him to react again during a pre-season friendly versus Harrow Borough in July 2007. Despite having been previously in negotiations to leave the club, Brooker received backing from new manager Terry Butcher, but after two early-2007–08 season appearances, his contract was terminated by mutual consent on 30 August 2007. He made 86 appearances and scored four goals during just over two seasons with Brentford.

Non-League football (2008–2010) 
Aside from a spell training with former club Brighton & Hove Albion in September 2008, Brooker spent the remainder of his career in non-League football, playing for Chertsey Town, Havant & Waterlooville and Dorking Wanderers.

Personal life
After leaving professional football, Brooker set up a carpet cleaning business.

Career statistics

Honours 
Fulham

 Football League Third Division second-place promotion: 1996–97

Brighton & Hove Albion

 Football League Second Division: 2001–02
 Football League Third Division: 2000–01

References

External links 
 
Paul Brooker at premierleague.com
Paul Brooker at readingfc.co.uk

1976 births
Living people
Footballers from Hammersmith
English footballers
Fulham F.C. players
Stevenage F.C. players
Brighton & Hove Albion F.C. players
Leicester City F.C. players
Reading F.C. players
Brentford F.C. players
Chertsey Town F.C. players
Havant & Waterlooville F.C. players
Dorking Wanderers F.C. players
English Football League players
Premier League players
National League (English football) players
Association football wingers